I Love Anisong (ILA) is the flagship concert of the Anime Festival Asia brand of events since 2008. It is being held in South East Asia and Hong Kong along with AFA, and as well as in Australia in collaboration with SMASH and the Philippines in collaboration with Cosplay Mania. 

Anime music